Bangkok Buddies is a 2019 Thai television series starring Vayu Kessuvit (Few), Ekkaphon Deeboonmee Na Chumphae (Au), Nuttapong Boonyuen (Max), Thanadol Auepong (Parm), Martin Sidel, Nichaphat Chatchaipholrat (Pearwah), Narupornkamol Chaisang (Praew) and Jidapa Siribunchawan (Jida). Inspired by 's hit song "ใจกลางเมือง" (Jai Klang Mueng), the series' lead male actors form part of BRAVO! BOYS, a talent search conducted by GMM Bravo in 2018.

Directed by Pongsathorn Thongcharoen and produced by Ekachai Uekrongtham under Bravo Studios, it was one of the several television series for 2019 launched by GMM 25 in their "Fun Fact Stories" event last 15 January 2019. It premiered on GMM 25 on 27 August 2019, airing on Tuesdays at 21:25 ICT. The series concluded on 19 November 2019.

It is also available for streaming on Netflix.

Synopsis 
Living in a small wooden house in the middle of Bangkok's Sathon District, a group of young working men with different personalities and professions are about to face the realities of life as they deal with everyday issues and their pursuit of romance.

Cast and characters 
Below are the cast of the series:

Main 
 Vayu Kessuvit (Few) as Jungo
 Ekkaphon Deeboonmee Na Chumphae (Au) as Takeshi
 Nuttapong Boonyuen (Max) as Dave
 Thanadol Auepong (Parm) as Krating
 Martin Sidel as Mikey
 Nichaphat Chatchaipholrat (Pearwah) as Vanessa
 Narupornkamol Chaisang (Praew) as Jim
 Jidapa Siribunchawan (Jida) as Ibiza

Supporting 
 Janya Thanasawaangkoun (Ya) as Somsri
 Krunnapol Teansuwan (Petch) as Vanessa's father
 Phakphol Tanpanit (RoodBus)
 Jah Deth Teng Hortnarong as Jah Deth
 Everest Moe as Eve
 Trung Hieu Le as Hieu
 Pawin Kulkarunyawich (Win)

Guest role 
 Warinda Damrongphol (DJ Dada)
 Isariya Patharamanop (Hunz)
 Thanachar Paosung (Net)

References

External links 
 Bangkok Buddies on GMM 25 website 
 Bangkok Buddies on Netflix

Television series by GMM Bravo
2019 Thai television series debuts
2019 Thai television series endings
GMM 25 original programming